50 Ways to Leave Your Lover is a 2004 American romantic comedy film written and directed by Jordan Hawley and starring Paul Schneider.

Cast
 Paul Schneider as Owen McCabe
 Jennifer Westfeldt as Val
 Poppy Montgomery as Allison
 Tori Spelling as Stephanie
 Fred Willard as Bucky Brandt
 Dorian Missick as Rob
 Elya Baskin as Dr. Stepniak

Reception
The film has a 60% rating on Rotten Tomatoes.

References

External links
 
 

American romantic comedy films
New Line Cinema films
2000s English-language films
2000s American films